Prosotas dilata is a species of lineblue (genus Prosotas) belonging to the blue butterfly family (Lycaenidae). The butterfly is found on the Nicobar Islands of India. It is now considered as a subspecies of the common lineblue (Prosotas nora).

See also
List of butterflies of India (Lycaenidae)

Cited references

References
 
 
 
 

Prosotas
Butterflies of Asia